Cheng Ch'ing-wen (16 September 1932 – 4 November 2017) was a Taiwanese writer and a graduate of National Taiwan University.  He worked at the then government-run  for forty years.  His works in English are generally under the transliteration "Cheng Ch'ing-Wen" and that is how he is described in many English-language publications published in Taiwan.  The transliteration "Tzeng Ching-wen" is also used.

He was one of the leaders of the Taiwanese "nativist" movement.  Cheng was fluent in Taiwanese Hokkien. He graduated from elementary school in Taiwan with six years of instruction in Japanese, and only thereafter began to learn Chinese.

A collection of twelve of his short stories, Three-Legged Horse, was made available in English in 1998, and won the 1999 Kiriyama Prize for fiction.

His works included short stories, essays, and fairy tales.  His three collections of fairy tales (Swallow Heart Berries, Sky Lanterns/Mother, and Picking Peaches) are populated with birds, insects, and other animals that all have the ability to speak, in a manner common to fairy tales.

Cheng died at the age of 85, on November 4, 2017.

References

"A Royal Palm: Cheng Ch'ing-wen as a Writer for Twenty Years" by Peng Jui-Chin, Taiwan Literature October 1977, pp. 176–190
"The Lonely Royal Palm-Discovering Cheng Ch'ing-wen's stories of Taiwan" ny Hsu Su-lan, Taiwan Daily News December 31, 1997

External links
 Three-Legged Horse  and 
Photo of Writer
Biography and photo (in Chinese)
Hua Nan Bank Website(in Chinese)

1932 births
2017 deaths
National Taiwan University alumni
Taiwanese male novelists
Taiwanese bankers
Writers from Taoyuan City
Taiwanese male short story writers
20th-century Taiwanese short story writers
20th-century male writers